Jana Rybářová ( 31 March 1936  – 11 February 1957) was a Czech film and stage actress.

Discovered by film director Václav Krška, she was recognized as one of the raising stars of 1950s despite featuring only in six films (and one student film). She committed suicide, in a widespread opinion, after a  complicated platonic romance with married opera singer Přemysl Kočí, aggravated by various rumours.

In 2000 Marek Bouda shot a documentary Nelze umírat štěstím (One Should Not Die of Happiness) about her life.

Filmography
 Stříbrný vítr (1954)
 Z mého života (1955)
 V ulici je starý krám (1955)
 Dalibor (1956)
 Labakan (1956)
 Legenda o lásce (1956)
 Proti všem (1957)

References

1936 births
1957 suicides
Czech film actresses
Czech stage actresses
20th-century Czech actresses
Suicides in Czechoslovakia
Actresses from Prague
Burials at Vyšehrad Cemetery
1957 deaths
Prague Conservatory alumni